George Zweig (born May 30, 1937) is a Russian-American physicist. He was trained as a particle physicist under Richard Feynman. He introduced, independently of Murray Gell-Mann, the quark model (although he named it "aces"). He later turned his attention to neurobiology. He has worked as a Research Scientist at Los Alamos National Laboratory and MIT,  and in  the financial services industry.

Early life
Zweig was born in Moscow, Soviet Union. His father was a structural engineer. He graduated from the University of Michigan in 1959, with a bachelor's degree in mathematics, having taken numerous physics courses as electives. He earned a PhD degree in theoretical physics at the California Institute of Technology in 1964.

Career
Zweig proposed the existence of quarks at CERN, independently of Murray Gell-Mann, shortly after defending his PhD dissertation.  Zweig dubbed  them "aces", after the four playing cards, because he speculated there were four of them (on the basis of the four extant leptons known at the time). The introduction of the concept of quarks provided a cornerstone for particle physics.

Like Gell-Mann, he realized that several important  properties of particles such as baryons (e.g., protons and neutrons)  could be explained by treating them as triplets of other constituent particles, with fractional baryon number and electric charge. In subsequent technical terminology, ultimately Gell-Mann's quarks were  closer to "current quarks", while Zweig's to "constituent quarks".

Gell-Mann received the Nobel Prize for physics in 1969, for his overall contributions and discoveries concerning the classification of elementary particles and their interactions; at that time, quark theory had not become fully accepted, and was not specifically mentioned in the official citation of the prize. In 1977 Richard Feynman nominated both Zweig, and Gell-Mann again, for the Nobel prize, but the nomination failed.

Zweig later turned to research on hearing and neurobiology, and studied the transduction of sound into nerve impulses in the cochlea of the human ear, and how the brain maps sound onto the spatial dimensions of the cerebral cortex.  In 1975, while studying the ear, he introduced a version of the continuous wavelet transform, the cochlear transform.

In 2003, Zweig joined the quantitative hedge fund Renaissance Technologies, founded by the former Cold War code breaker James Simons. He left the firm in 2010. Once his four-year confidentiality agreement with Renaissance Technologies expired, the 78-year-old Zweig returned to Wall Street and co-founded a quantitative hedge fund, called Signition, with two younger partners. They began trading in 2015.

Awards and honors
 MacArthur Prize Fellowship (1981)
 National Academy of Sciences (1996)
 Sakurai Prize (2015)

References

MacArthur Fellows
21st-century American physicists
American neuroscientists
Particle physicists
People associated with CERN
Jewish American scientists
American people of Russian-Jewish descent
1937 births
Living people
Soviet Jews
Scientists from Moscow
Members of the United States National Academy of Sciences
University of Michigan College of Literature, Science, and the Arts alumni
Los Alamos National Laboratory personnel
Jewish physicists
Fellows of the Acoustical Society of America
J. J. Sakurai Prize for Theoretical Particle Physics recipients
21st-century American Jews